Turner is an unincorporated village in Blaine County, Montana, United States. It is 12 miles south of the Canadian border. Its population was 61 as of the 2010 census.

Turner has the post office serving ZIP code 59542,  and other businesses and services.  Its name is the reference name for the US-Canada border crossing 12 miles to its north.  Since 1980, Turner has been a part of the CDP which also bears its name. Google Maps drove along the outskirts of the village but did not videograph it in any detail.

Demographics

History
In 1912, Henry Turner built a store and opened a post office. In 1928 the town moved about two miles to the location of the Great Northern Railway's new line between Saco and Hogeland.

Climate
According to the Köppen Climate Classification system, Turner has a semi-arid climate, abbreviated "BSk" on climate maps.

Infrastructure
Turner Airport is a public use airport located 1 mile northeast of town.

Trivia

Education
Turner educates students from kindergarten through 12th grade. Turner High School had 18 students in 2021. They are known as the Turner Tornadoes.

References

External links
Turner community website
Montana Department of Transportation map of Turner

Census-designated places in Blaine County, Montana
Census-designated places in Montana
Unincorporated communities in Montana
Unincorporated communities in Blaine County, Montana